Bethlehem is a suburb of Tauranga in New Zealand's North Island.  Originally a small independent town, it has now been absorbed by Tauranga and comprises a number of subdivisions including Bethlehem Heights, Sterling Gate, La Cumbre, Saint Andrews, and Mayfield.

It is situated on State Highway 2, and has amenities such as the Bethlehem Town Centre shopping centre.

Demographics

Bethlehem had a population of 8,634 at the 2018 New Zealand census, an increase of 1,584 people (22.5%) since the 2013 census, and an increase of 3,078 people (55.4%) since the 2006 census. There were 3,228 households, comprising 4,044 males and 4,593 females, giving a sex ratio of 0.88 males per female, with 1,473 people (17.1%) aged under 15 years, 1,068 (12.4%) aged 15 to 29, 3,369 (39.0%) aged 30 to 64, and 2,724 (31.5%) aged 65 or older.

Ethnicities were 85.8% European/Pākehā, 10.8% Māori, 1.5% Pacific peoples, 8.3% Asian, and 1.3% other ethnicities. People may identify with more than one ethnicity.

The percentage of people born overseas was 24.7, compared with 27.1% nationally.

Although some people chose not to answer the census's question about religious affiliation, 40.2% had no religion, 49.0% were Christian, 1.0% had Māori religious beliefs, 0.7% were Hindu, 0.2% were Muslim, 0.7% were Buddhist and 1.7% had other religions.

Of those at least 15 years old, 1,569 (21.9%) people had a bachelor's or higher degree, and 1,206 (16.8%) people had no formal qualifications. 1,392 people (19.4%) earned over $70,000 compared to 17.2% nationally. The employment status of those at least 15 was that 2,694 (37.6%) people were employed full-time, 1,053 (14.7%) were part-time, and 177 (2.5%) were unemployed.

Marae
Bethlehem has two Ngāti Ranginui marae:
 Hangarau or Peterehema Marae and its Hangarau is affiliated with Ngāti Hangarau.
 Te Wairoa Marae and its Kahu Tapu meeting house are affiliated with Ngāti Kahu, Ngāti Pango and Ngāti Rangi.

Economy

Bethlehem Town Centre

Bethlehem Town Centre is a shopping area covering 20,000 m². It has 1000 carparks and about 50 retailers, including Kmart, Countdown and Smiths City.

Education

Bethlehem Campus

The local Bethlehem Campus includes several Christian educational institutions on a single site.

In January 2013 a van of Bethlehem College students and former students crashed in a small village in Kenya, while they were on a volunteer mission at Ark Quest Academy. Student Caitlin Dickson was killed, as were married couple Brian and Grace Johnston. Kenyan bus driver Christopher Mmata was also killed.

In 2022 Bethlehem College received considerable media attention when it was revealed that the school contract had a clause in it which made parents and their children agree that marriage is between a man and a woman. Allegations of homophobic bullying within the school came to light following this, resulting in a petition for the Education Review Office and the Ministry of Education to investigate the school, launched by Shaneel Lal.

Bethlehem Tertiary Institute, formerly the Bethlehem Institute of Education, is a tertiary institution offering Degrees and Diplomas in teaching, social work and counselling and a Master of Professional Practice. Over 400 students are enrolled and students may study either onsite with a 'flipped classroom' approach or through innovative distance learning. The academy was founded in 1988 as a primary school with 100 students, and has expanded since to offer secondary and tertiary education.

Notable former students include Kiri Allan (Member of Parliament), David Farrier (journalist and actor), Michael Ashton (makeup artist), Sam Tanner (1500m athlete) and Mika Vukona (professional basketball player).

Other schools

Bethlehem has three other schools.

References

External links 
 Bethlehem School website
 Tauranga Adventist School website

Suburbs of Tauranga
Populated places around the Tauranga Harbour